Linoy Rogers (born 28 February 1994) is an Israeli footballer who plays as a defender and has appeared for the Israel women's national team.

Career
Rogers has been capped for the Israel national team, appearing for the team during the 2019 FIFA Women's World Cup qualifying cycle.

References

External links
 
 
 

1994 births
Israeli Jews
Living people
Israeli women's footballers
Israel women's international footballers
Women's association football defenders
Footballers from Dimona
Israeli people of Indian-Jewish descent